Carmel College Sixth Form is a sixth form college on The Headlands in Hummersknott, Darlington, England. It is a post-16 extension of Carmel College, A Catholic Academy of which the college is attached to.

Admissions
Carmel Sixth Form College admits around 150 students each year, mostly aged between 16 and 18. It offers full-time courses of around 30 AS and A-level courses and several BTEC and enrichment courses.

General entry requirements are 5 GCSEs at grades A*-C, however, many courses may request at least a grade B in specific subjects.

Academic performance
The most recent A-level exam results (summer 2011) were outstanding with a pass rate of 99.4% and an average of 922 points per student.

Carmel Sixth Form College performs in the top twenty state schools at A-level in the North East.

References

External links
 Carmel College Sixth Form

Sixth form colleges in County Durham
Schools in Darlington